Gordon Alfred Swann (September 21, 1931 – 2013) was an American geologist.  He received his PhD from the University of Colorado in 1962, and studied the Precambrian geology of the Front Range of Colorado.  He is notable for his work with NASA and the training of the astronauts of the Apollo program in field geology.

Swann served as the Principal Investigator of the Apollo Lunar Geologic Experiment for Apollo 14 and Apollo 15.  A part of the Montes Apenninus (south of Mons Hadley) at the Apollo 15 landing site was informally called the Swann Range in his honor by the astronauts.

The asteroid 4082 Swann is named after him.

References

American geologists
Apollo 14
Apollo 15
University of Colorado alumni